The capital ships of a navy are its most important warships; they are generally the larger ships when compared to other warships in their respective fleet. A capital ship is generally a leading or a primary ship in a naval fleet.

Strategic implications
There is usually no formal criterion for the classification, but it is a useful concept in naval strategy; for example, it permits comparisons between relative naval strengths in a theatre of operations without the need for considering specific details of tonnage or gun diameters.

A notable example of this is the Mahanian doctrine, which was applied in the planning of the defence of Singapore in World War II, where the Royal Navy had to decide the allocation of its battleships and battlecruisers between the Atlantic and Pacific theatres. The Mahanian doctrine was also applied by the Imperial Japanese Navy, leading to its preventive move to attack Pearl Harbor and the battleships of the U.S. Pacific Fleet. The naval nature of the Pacific Theater of Operations, more commonly referred to as the Pacific War, necessitated the United States Navy mostly deploying its battleships and aircraft carriers in the Pacific. The war in Europe was primarily a land war; consequently, Germany's surface fleet was small, and the escort ships used in the Battle of the Atlantic were mostly destroyers and destroyer escorts to counter the U-boat threat.

Age of Sail
Before the advent of the all-steel navy in the late 19th century, a capital ship during the Age of Sail was generally understood as a ship that conformed to the Royal Navy's rating system of a ship of the line as being of the first, second, third or fourth rates:
 First rate: 100 or more guns, typically carried on three or four decks. Four-deckers suffered in rough seas, and the lowest deck could seldom fire except in calm conditions .
 Second rate: 90–98 guns.
 Third rate: 64 to 80 guns (although 64-gun third-raters were small and not very numerous in any era).
 Fourth rate: 46 to 60 guns. By 1756, these ships were acknowledged to be too weak to stand in the line of battle and were relegated to ancillary duties, although they also served in the shallow North Sea and American littorals where larger ships of the line could not sail.

Frigates were ships of the fifth rate; sixth rates comprised small frigates and corvettes. Towards the end of the Napoleonic Wars and into the late 19th century, some larger and more powerful frigates were classified as fourth rates.

Battleship / battlecruiser
The term "capital ship" was first coined in 1909 and formally defined in the limitation treaties of the 1920s and 1930s in the Washington Naval Treaty, London Naval Treaty, and Second London Naval Treaty. This applied mainly to ships resulting from the dreadnought revolution; dreadnought battleships (also known first as dreadnoughts and later as battleships) and battlecruisers.

In the 20th century, especially in World Wars I and II, typical capital ships would be battleships and battlecruisers. All of the above ships were close to 20,000 tons displacement or heavier, with large caliber guns and heavy armor protection.

Cruisers, despite being important ships, were not considered capital ships. Though this class was technically similar to a heavy cruiser, albeit slower but with considerably heavier guns, they were regarded by some as capital ships (hence the British label "Pocket battleship") since they were one of the few heavy surface units of the Kriegsmarine. The American , Dutch Design 1047 battlecruiser and the Japanese Design B-65 cruiser, planned specifically to counter the heavy cruisers being built by their naval rivals, have been described as "super cruisers", "large cruisers" or even "unrestricted cruisers", with some advocating that they even be considered as battlecruisers, however they were never classified as capital ships.

During the Cold War, a Soviet  large missile cruiser had a displacement great enough to rival World War II-era battleships and battlecruisers, perhaps defining a new capital ship for that era. In regard to technical design, however, the Kirov is simply a supersized guided-missile cruiser with nuclear propulsion.

Aircraft carrier

It took until late 1942 for aircraft carriers to be universally considered capital ships.  Only full-size fleet carriers (whether purpose built, or converted from battleship/battlecruiser hulls) were regarded as capital ships, while light carriers (often using cruiser hulls) and escort carriers (often using merchant ship hulls) were not. The U.S. Navy was forced to rely primarily on its aircraft carriers after the attack on Pearl Harbor sank or damaged eight of its Pacific-fleet battleships.

In the 21st century, the aircraft carrier is the last remaining capital ship, with capability defined in decks available and aircraft per deck rather than in guns and calibers. The United States possesses supremacy in both contemporary categories of aircraft carriers, possessing 11 active duty supercarriers each capable of carrying and launching nearly 100 tactical aircraft, and nine amphibious assault ships which are equivalent in the "Sea Control Ship" configuration to the light VSTOL carriers operated by other nations.

Nuclear submarines
Ballistic missile submarines (or "boomers"), while important ships and similar in tonnage to early battleships, are usually counted as part of a nation's nuclear deterrent force and do not share the sea control mission of traditional capital ships. Nevertheless, many navies, including the Royal Navy and the United States Navy, consider these ships to be capital ships and have given some of them names previously used for battleships, e.g. Dreadnought and Vanguard.

Naming
Some navies reserve specific names for their capital ships. Names reserved for capital ships include chiefs of state (e.g. ), important places, historically important naval officers or admiralty (e.g. ), historical events or objects (e.g. ), and traditional names (e.g. ). However, there are some exceptions to the rule.

Cruisers are typically named after U.S. territories (e.g. Alaska-class cruisers just before and during World War II) or U.S. cities. Prior to and during World War II, the Imperial Japanese Navy also followed the practice of naming battleships after provinces (e.g. ).

Despite their significance to modern fleets, the U.S. Navy has never named aircraft carriers after U.S. states. Today, U.S. aircraft carriers are usually named after politicians and other individuals notable in US naval history such as Gerald R. Ford and Chester W. Nimitz except Enterprise.

Beginning with the first class of Trident-equipped ballistic missile submarines (i.e. the ), state names have been applied to U.S. nuclear submarines. Previous ballistic missile submarines (e.g. Poseidon missile-equipped submarines) had not been named for states. After the completion of the last Ohio-class ballistic missile submarine, state names were also applied to attack submarines (e.g. ).

See also
 Ship of the line
 Flagship
 Dreadnought
 Battleship
 Battlecruiser
 Aircraft carrier
 Nuclear submarine
 List of sunken battleships
 List of sunken battlecruisers
 List of sunken aircraft carriers
 List of sunken nuclear submarines

Notes

References

Ship types